The Battle of the Caribbean refers to a naval campaign waged during World War II that was part of the Battle of the Atlantic, from 1941 to 1945. German U-boats and Italian submarines attempted to disrupt the Allied supply of oil and other material. They sank shipping in the Caribbean Sea and the Gulf of Mexico and attacked coastal targets in the Antilles. Improved Allied anti-submarine warfare eventually drove the Axis submarines out of the Caribbean region.

Background
The Caribbean was strategically significant because of Venezuelan oil fields in the southeast and the Panama Canal in the southwest. The Royal Dutch Shell refinery  on Dutch-owned Curaçao was processing eleven million barrels per month making it the largest oil refinery in the world; the refinery at Pointe-à-Pierre on Trinidad was the largest in the British Empire; and there was another large refinery on Dutch-owned Aruba. The British Isles required four oil tankers of petroleum daily during the early war years, and most of it came from Venezuela, through Curaçao, after Italy blocked passage through the Mediterranean Sea from the Middle East.

The Caribbean held additional strategic significance to the United States. The United States' Gulf of Mexico coastline, including petroleum facilities and Mississippi River trade, could be defended at two points. The United States was well positioned to defend the Straits of Florida but was less able to prevent access from the Caribbean through the Yucatán Channel. Bauxite was the preferred ore for aluminum, and one of the few strategic raw materials not available within the continental United States. United States military aircraft production depended upon bauxite imported from the Guianas along shipping routes paralleling the Lesser Antilles. The United States defended the Panama Canal with 189 bombers and 202 fighters, and based submarines at Colón, Panama and at Submarine Base, Crown Bay, St. Thomas, U.S. Virgin Islands.  United States Navy VP-51 Consolidated PBY Catalinas began neutrality patrols along the Lesser Antillies from San Juan, Puerto Rico on 13 September 1939; and facilities were upgraded at Guantanamo Bay Naval Base and at Naval Air Station Key West.

The United Kingdom based No. 749, 750, 752 and 793 Naval Air Squadrons at Piarco International Airport on Trinidad. British troops occupied Aruba, Curaçao and Bonaire soon after the Netherlands were captured by Nazi Germany. The French island of Martinique was perceived as a possible base for Axis ships as British relationships with Vichy France deteriorated following the Second Armistice at Compiègne. The September 1940 Destroyers for Bases Agreement enabled the United States to build airfields in British Guiana, and on the islands of Great Exuma, Trinidad, Antigua, and Saint Lucia. On 11 February 1942, United States forces replaced British soldiers on the Dutch refinery islands and began operating Douglas A-20 Havocs from Hato Field on Curaçao and Dakota Field on Aruba.

Axis operations

Operation Neuland

The first three U-boats launched simultaneous attacks on 16 February 1942. U-502 sank crude oil tankers Monagas, Tia Juana and San Nicholas between Lake Maracaibo and Aruba. U-67 entered Willemstad harbour on Curaçao and torpedoed three oil tankers. The four torpedoes from the bow tubes were duds, but the stern tube torpedoes sank Rafaela. U-156 entered San Nicolas harbour on Aruba and torpedoed oil tankers Pedernales, Oranjestad and Arkansas. U-156 then attempted to shell the Aruba refinery with its 10.5 cm SK C/32 naval gun; but the gun barrel burst when the first shell exploded because the gun crew failed to remove the tampion. The Germans slightly damaged a large storage tank. A Venezuelan gunboat, assisted in rescuing the crews of several torpedoed vessels; and A-20 Havoc light bombers attacked all three U-boats unsuccessfully; Resulting in an increased American occupation of the island began for its protection.

U-161 entered Trinidad's Gulf of Paria on 18 February to torpedo Mokihama and the oil tanker British Consul. As the U-boats settled into routine patrolling, U-67 torpedoed oil tankers J.N.Pew and Penelope; U-502 torpedoed oil tankers Kongsgaard, Thallia and Sun; U-156 torpedoed Delplata and oil tanker La Carriere; U-161 torpedoed Lihue and oil tankers Circle Shell, Uniwaleco and Esso Bolivar; and U-129 torpedoed George L. Torrain, West Zeda, Lennox, Bayou, Mary, Steel Age and the oil tanker Nordvangen. The U-156 crew used hacksaws to cut off the damaged portion of the gun barrel; and, when U-156 ran out of torpedoes, used their sawn-off deck gun to sink Macgregor and the oil tanker Oregon. On 10 March U-161 entered Castries harbour on Saint Lucia to torpedo  and Umtata. After leaving Saint Lucia, U-161 torpedoed Sarniadoc and sank the United States Coast Guard lighthouse tender  with gunfire.

Other operations
Five Italian submarines patrolled the Atlantic side of the Lesser Antillies during Operation Neuland. Morosini torpedoed Stangarth and oil tankers Oscilla and Peder Bogen. Enrico Tazzoli torpedoed Cygnet and the oil tanker Athelqueen. Giuseppe Finzi torpedoed Skane and oil tankers Melpomere and Charles Racine.  torpedoed Everasma and the neutral Brazilian Cabadelo. Luigi Torelli torpedoed Scottish Star and the oil tanker Esso Copenhagen.  was simultaneously patrolling the Windward Passage between Cuba and Hispaniola torpedoing Gunny, Barbara, Cardona, Texan, Olga, Colabee, and oil tankers Hanseat and Halo between 2 March and 13 March.   moved south from Florida.

A German submarine shelled the Puerto Rican island of Mona, some forty miles west of the mainland of Puerto Rico, on March 3, 1942. No damage or casualties resulted.

An oil refinery on Curaçao was shelled on 19 April 1942 by  under Korvettenkapitän (lieutenant commander) Ernst Kals. The small engagement ended in a German failure. Kals ordered the shelling of several petroleum storage tanks but after only five shots, a Dutch shore battery responded which forced him to abort. Later a German U-boat attacked a merchant ship off Curaçao and was engaged by Dutch anti-aircraft and naval gun batteries but again the submarine escaped harm.

German submarines sank two Dominican merchant marine ships in May 1942, after the Dominican Republic entered World War II on the side of the Allies.

Attacks on Allied shipping
 was an American-flagged,  cargo ship that was sunk on the morning of 13 May in the Caribbean by a U-boat. At 03:38, U-69—under the command of Kptlt. Ulrich Graf—fired two torpedoes from a surfaced position. U-69 began shelling Norlantic as she attempted to flee the scene. After several hits the American ship signaled the Germans to cease fire so they could escape the inferno in their life-rafts. The Germans failed to hold their fire while two lifeboats were lowered, then at 04:11 they fired a coup de grâce which hit Norlantics boiler room. She sank, taking six men down with her, two men were killed by the torpedo and four men killed from the shelling. Norlantics surviving crew were then adrift at sea for several days before being rescued by Allied ships.

Sixteen men died in the two attacks. This prompted Mexico to declare war on Germany on 22 May 1942.

SS  was a tanker of the Standard Oil and Transportation Company during World War II when  torpedoed her. The attack occurred on 20 May just southwest of Grenada in the Caribbean Sea. Attempts to tow her to port did not succeed, and she sank on 28 May, at position 12° 50' north, 67° 32' west.

The American ship holding thousands of barrels of molasses was hit in the engine room. The torpedo destroyed the engines and caused a boiler to explode and a moment later another torpedo hit the ship. Six men were killed and 38 survivors made it to shore. Two days later, U-157 was sunk by a United States Coast Guard cutter.

 attacked the  Mexican tanker  on 4 September at the position 23°27′N 97°30′W / 23.45°N 97.5°W / 23.45; -97.5. The Mexicans evaded three attacks of two torpedoes each before being hit by one in a final spread. Amatlan sank with 10 men and another 24 sailors survived.

On 11 September, —under Kptlt. The ship sank in shallow waters after a short exchange, but was raised and towed to Trinidad in December 1942 and later towed to Mobile, Alabama, arriving on 24 January 1943.

On 5 July 1943,  to the west of Port-Salut, Haiti,  encountered the American-flagged steamer Maltran, which was part of Convoy GTMO-134. U-759 fired torpedoes and at least one hit the vessel. Maltran sank within 15 minutes of being hit, though all of her crew survived and escaped the danger in lifeboats.
On 7 July, U-759 torpedoed the Dutch cargo ship Poelau Roebiah, in Convoy TAG-70. The ship sank just east of Jamaica, taking down two men. Sixty-eight others were rescued. After sinking Poelau Roebiah U-759 was chased down and attacked by the U.S. Navy the following day. A PBM Mariner flying boat first dropped a load of explosives over the sub, and then for seven hours American surface vessels depth charged the area, but U-759 escaped without damage or loss of life.

Sunken warships

Axis vessels

U-157 was sunk on 13 June 1942 by the U.S. Coast Guard. The German submarine submerged and attempted to flee but Thetis gained sonar contact and began a depth charge attack. After several minutes, the action ended when debris and oil were spotted by the Coast Guard crew. Thetis sank U-157.

Seven days after escaping attacking Allied ships off Haiti on 8 July 1943, U-759 was reported sunk; post war research discovered it was not until an attack on 23 July that she was actually destroyed. An American PBM Mariner at the approximate position of  bombed and sank the boat.

 off Bermuda  at Coordinates:  on 30 June 1942 was sunk by a  Martin PBM Mariner. Commanded by  Richard Schreder when it took a  direct hit on the deck of the submarine with a depth charge. The depth charge did not explode on impact,  it merely lodged itself into the teak planking of the deck. However, as the U-boat submerged,  the charge detonated after the sub carried it down to its pre-set trigger depth.

Suddenly, a torpedo hit Lee, and PC-566 discovered the attacking . PC-566 launched depth charges at the submarine and sank her though it was not until after the war sinking was confirmed.

On 28 August,  was in operation against convoy TAW 15 off Haiti when attacked by American and Canadian escorts. First, an American PBY swooped down and bombed the U-boat, and then Canadian corvettes  and  attacked.  fired depth charges which forced the submarine to the surface. The corvette then rammed U-94 twice before it slowed to a stop. Hal Lawrence led a boarding party of eleven sailors from Oakville to capture the boat. They boarded the vessel and entered through the conning tower. Only two Canadians actually went through the hatch, they were surprised by two Germans who came running towards them. After ordering halt, the Canadians fired and killed the attacking Germans when they failed to stop. The rest of the crew surrendered without incident. After just barely capturing the vessel, the Canadian sailors realized the Germans had already scuttled the boat and it was taking on water. The Canadians left U-94 and she sank with nineteen of her crew; Oakville rescued 26, including the commander, Oberleutnant zur See Otto Ites.

 was detected and sunk northeast of Trinidad by the Royal Navy on 3 September. Three British destroyers—,  and —attacked U-162 with depth charges, killed two Germans and sank the boat. Forty-nine additional sailors survived and became prisoners of war in the U.S. The crew was interrogated and provided valuable information to the U.S. Army Intelligence about U-boats and their submarine base at Lorient. The German skipper—Kptlt. Jürgen Wattenberg—escaped in late 1944 before being recaptured a month or so later.

On 15 May 1943, the Cuban freighters Camaguey and Honduran Hanks were being escorted by three small Cuban Navy submarine chasers from Sagua La Grande to Havana. The convoy was nearing Havana in the Gulf of Mexico when an American reconnaissance aircraft spotted a German U-boat. CS-13 attacked with depth charges and quickly sank the U-boat which killed all of her crew.

Allied vessels

French submarine cruiser Surcouf, the largest submarine in the world at the time, was rammed and sunk by the freighter Thomas Lykes near the Atlantic side of the Panama Canal on 18 February 1942. There were no survivors.

Ten men were killed when three torpedoes slammed into George Calvert and she was underwater within minutes. The surviving crew were captured by the Germans and interrogated before being freed in lifeboats. Three armed guards were killed and the survivors made it to the Cuban shore.

Two torpedoes hit the coffee laden Henry Gibbins on her port side over the course of 20 minutes and she sank soon after. All of her 47 crew and 21 U.S. Army guards survived the encounter and were rescued a day later.

SS Stephen Hopkins was an armed American liberty ship which fought during World War II. On 27 September, Stephen Hopkins was returning to Surinam from Cape Town when attacked by the auxiliary cruiser Stier. Stephen Hopkins was ordered to stop by the Germans, the Americans refused, so they opened fire with their main battery. A lone  gun and a few machine guns were then put in operation by the Americans and a short but violent battle was fought. Both vessels suffered casualties and by 10:00 the American ship was sunk. Stier was badly damaged as well and could no longer make steam so her commander scuttled her less than two hours after defeating the American vessel.

The American gunboat  was escorting Convoy TAG-20 in the Caribbean between Trinidad and Guantánamo Bay when attacked 10 miles south of Curaçao by a German U-boat in November 1942. —under Kurt-Eduard Engelmann—surfaced and fired three torpedoes at Erie. The Americans spotted the submarine and the torpedoes, then took evasive maneuvers. Erie escaped two of them but was hit by the third and badly damaged. Her crew grounded her on the nearby shore and she burned for several hours before the flames were brought under control. American forces suffered seven killed and eleven wounded in the attack. Later, Erie was towed to Curaçao's Willemstad Harbor but capsized and sank on 5 December.

In fiction

The Battle of the Caribbean forms part of the plot of the novel Sharks and Little Fish. The protagonist's U-boat is first sent into the Caribbean and takes part in sinking American vessels off Trinidad, before being moved to the North Atlantic.

See also
Martinique in World War II
Naval Base Trinidad

References

Further reading

External links
https://web.archive.org/web/20120403005645/http://uboatsbahamas.com/ – History of 150 Allied ships attacked by 85 German and Italian submarines in the 1 million-mile area bounded by: North of the Greater Antilles Anegada to Havana, Havana to Key West, Charleston to Bermuda, and Bermuda to Anegada, including all of the Bahamas, 1939–1945.
Cubans sunk a German submarine in World War II

1940s in Aruba
U-boats
Caribbean Sea operations of World War II
Military history of the Caribbean
Naval battles of World War II involving Germany
Naval battles of World War II involving Canada
Naval battles of World War II involving the Netherlands
Naval battles and operations of World War II involving the United Kingdom
Naval battles of World War II involving the United States
1941 in the Caribbean
1942 in the Caribbean
1943 in the Caribbean
1944 in the Caribbean
1945 in the Caribbean
Battles of World War II involving Canada
Military history of Canada during World War II
Military history of British Honduras during World War II
Military history of British Guiana during World War II